Gavan Hennigan (born 1981) is an Irish Extreme Environment Athlete.

Background
Hennigan grew up in Galway, Ireland. At the age of 16, he began abusing alcohol and drugs as a means to deal with his homosexuality and his father's alcoholism. Hennigan travelled abroad, living in a squat in Amsterdam and an unfurnished flat in London. He suffered blackouts from alcohol and drug overdoses, eventually entering rehab for his addictions when he was 21.

Sports career
By trade a saturation diver on oil rigs for over 10 years, in 2016 Hennigan became the "fastest solo competitor in the history of the Talisker Whisky Atlantic Challenge, dubbed the world's toughest row." Hennigan completed the three thousand mile long journey in "49 days, 11 hours and 37 minutes."

Charitable work
Hennigan pursues snowboarding, mountaineering, ultra running, and rowing, raising over €12,000 for local Galway charities.

References

1981 births
21st-century Irish people
People from County Galway
Irish sailors
Living people
Irish male rowers
Professional divers
Irish ultramarathon runners
Irish LGBT sportspeople
Gay sportsmen
LGBT rowers